From 1976 until 2010, the Spanish sports magazine Don Balón conferred the Don Balón Award (Premio Don Balón) to the best Spanish player, the best foreign player, the best referee and the breakthrough player in La Liga. These awards ceased to exist after the closure of the magazine in 2011.

Winners

By foreign player (multiple)

By Spanish player (multiple)

By manager (multiple)

Team of the Decade (2000s) 
(Published December 2010)

Player of the Decade (2000s) 
(Published December 2010)

See also
Don Balón
LaLiga Awards
Pichichi Trophy
Zamora Trophy
Zarra Trophy
Trofeo Alfredo Di Stéfano
Trofeo EFE
Trofeo Aldo Rovira

Miguel Muñoz Trophy

References

External links
 Official web site
Spanish football awards by Don Balón

La Liga trophies and awards
1976 establishments in Spain
2010 disestablishments in Spain
Awards established in 1976
Awards disestablished in 2010
Spanish football trophies and awards
Annual events in Spain